Lee Yeong-ha (born 10 November 1956) is a South Korean speed skater. He competed at the 1976 Winter Olympics, the 1980 Winter Olympics and the 1984 Winter Olympics.

References

1956 births
Living people
South Korean male speed skaters
Olympic speed skaters of South Korea
Speed skaters at the 1976 Winter Olympics
Speed skaters at the 1980 Winter Olympics
Speed skaters at the 1984 Winter Olympics
Speed skaters from Seoul